Birobidzhan Railway Station is the primary passenger railway station for the city of Birobidzhan in Russia, and an important stop along the Trans-Siberian Railway.

Trains
 Moscow — Vladivostok
 Novosibirsk — Vladivostok
 Moscow — Khabarovsk
 Khabarovsk — Neryungri
 Khabarovsk — Chegdomyn

References

Railway stations in the Jewish Autonomous Oblast
Trans-Siberian Railway
Railway stations in the Russian Empire opened in 1915
Cultural heritage monuments in the Jewish Autonomous Oblast
Objects of cultural heritage of Russia of regional significance